The flag of the Arab League comprises a green banner bearing the seal of the Arab League. The twenty-two links in the chain represent the twenty-two members of the League at the time of the flag's adoption. The script gives the name of the organization: "League of Arab States".

There are also several flags for the Arab League, usually seen at Arab League summits: one, a color-inverted Arab League flag with a white background for the President of the summit was clearly seen in the Arab League Summit in Beirut (2002).

Older Arab League flags have the chains in red or black, the Arabic script in black or gold with green or white crescents, usually adopted in the 1950s to the 1970s.

History 
The flag was adopted on March 8, 1945 as the organization's National flag. The original creator of the flag is unknown. The flag serves as an official flag for Algeria, Bahrain, Djibouti, Egypt, Iraq, Jordan, Kuwait, Lebanon, Libya, Mauritania, Morocco, Oman, Palestine, Qatar, Saudi Arabia, Somalia, Sudan, Syria, Tunisia, United Arab Emirates, Yemen.

Description 
The flag contains a modified version of the Emblem of the Arab League portrayed in the center of the flag on a green background. The twenty-two chain links of the emblem represents the twenty-two countries members of The league.

Other flags

See also
Arab League
Flag of the African Union
Flag of the Arab Revolt
Flag of Europe
Flag of the United Nations
List of Arab flags
Pan-Arab colors

References

Arab League
Arab nationalist symbols
League
Arab League
Flags introduced in 1945